Kai Tak Airport was the international airport of Hong Kong from 1925 until 1998.

Kai Tak or Kai-tak may also refer to:
Kai Tak Cruise Terminal, a cruise terminal in New Kowloon, Hong Kong
Kai Tak Development, an urban development plan for the Kai Tak old airport site
Kai Tak Nullah, nullah in northern New Kowloon, Hong Kong
Kai Tak station, Hong Kong railway station on the Tuen Ma Line of the Shatin-Central Link
Kai Tak Sports Park, sports stadium to be built at the site of the original Kai Tak Airport
Kai Tak Tunnel, tunnel in New Kowloon, Hong Kong
RAF Kai Tak, former Royal Air Force station in Hong Kong
Kai Tak (constituency), a former constituency in the Kowloon City District

See also
Typhoon Kai-tak (disambiguation)